The 1804 New York gubernatorial election was held in April 1804 to elect the Governor and Lieutenant Governor of New York.

Candidates
The Clintonian faction of the Democratic Republican Party nominated former Attorney General of New York and Supreme Court of New York justice Morgan Lewis. They nominated state senator John Broome for Lieutenant Governor.

Although a Democratic-Republican, incumbent Vice President of the United States Aaron Burr was backed by members of the Federalist Party who wanted to see New York join the New England states in an independent confederation. This scheme was opposed by High Federalist Alexander Hamilton, the party's national leader. Burr subsequently killed Hamilton in a duel. U.S. representative Oliver Phelps was nominated for Lieutenant Governor.

Results
The Clintonian ticket of Lewis and Broome was elected.

Sources
Result: The Tribune Almanac 1841

See also
New York gubernatorial elections
New York state elections

1804
Gubernatorial
New York
April 1804 events